Castilian nationalism or "Castilianism" is a fringe political movement that advocates for the national recognition of Castile, and in some cases, its independence from Spain.

History 
The 19th century saw the development of what historian  terms as a Castilian "regio-nationalism", fostered by a sense of grievance against Catalonia among the Conservative milieus (supportive of the protectionist interests of the flour-making Bourgeoisie) who pitted themselves against central power in the wake of the 1843 freetrading policies brought forward by Espartero.

During the Second Republic, Castilian nationalist postulates were fringe, adopting a merely "mimetic and defensive" role that tended to fade towards otherwise strongly anti-Catalanist regionalist stances, just as it had been previously the case with the messages of Burgos (1918) and Segovia (1919).

A new sovereignist and internationalist leftist iteration of Castilianism, characterised by the most radical rejection of the identification of 'Castile' with 'Spain' (referred to as Spanish State among its followers), emerged after the creation of Castilian Popular Unity (UPC) in 1983, and, most notably, Castilian Left (IzCa) in 2000.

See also
Castilian people

References 
Notes

Bibliography
 
 
 

 
Nationalism in Spain